ACM Conference on Recommender Systems (ACM RecSys) is a peer-reviewed academic conference series about recommender systems. Sponsored by the Association for Computing Machinery. This conference series focuses on issues such as algorithms, machine learning, human-computer interaction, and data science from a multi-disciplinary perspective. The conference community includes computer scientists, statisticians, social scientists, psychologists, and others.

The conference is sponsored by Big Tech companies such as Amazon, Netflix, Meta, Nvidia, Microsoft, Google, and Spotify, and large foundations such as the NSF.

While an academic conference, RecSys attracts many practitioners and industry researchers, with industry attendance making up the majority of attendees, this is also reflected in the authorship of research papers. Many works published at the conference have direct impact on recommendation and personalization practice in  industry affecting millions of users.

Recommender systems are pervasive in online systems, the conference provides opportunities for researchers and practitioners to address specific problems in various workshops in conjunction with the conference, topics include responsible recommendation, causal reasoning, and others. The workshop themes follow recent developments in the broader machine learning and human-computer interaction topics. 

The conference is the host of the ACM RecSys Challenge, a yearly competition in the spirit of the Netflix Prize focussing on a specific recommendation problem. The Challenge has been organized by companies such as Twitter, and Spotify. Participation in the challenge is open to everyone and participation in it has become a means of showcasing ones skills in recommendations, similar to Kaggle competitions.

Notable Events

Netflix Prize, 2009 
The Netflix Prize was a recommendation challenge organized by Netflix between 2006 and 2009. Shortly prior to ACM RecSys 2009, the winners of the Netflix Prize were announced. At the 2009 conference, members of the winning team (Bellkor's Pragmatich Chaos) as well as representatives from Netflix convened in a panel on the lessons learnt from the Netflix Prize

ByteDance Paper, 2022 
In 2022, at one of the workshops at the conference, a paper from ByteDance, the company behind TikTok, described in detail how a recommendation algorithm for video worked. 
While the paper did not point out the algorithm as the one that generates TikTok's recommendations, the paper received significant attention in technology-focused media

List of conferences
Past and future RecSys conferences include:

References

External links
 

Computer science conferences
Association for Computing Machinery conferences